Stephen James Allender (born 24 July 1960) is a former Australian rules footballer who played for the Sydney Swans and Hawthorn in the Victorian Football League (VFL) during the 1980s.

Allender attracted the attention of VFL recruiters with his strong performance for Port Melbourne in 1980, when he won the J. J. Liston Trophy and played in a premiership team. Carlton ended up granting him a clearance to South Melbourne, but South Melbourne was fined $20,000 by the VFL for poaching.

A ruckman or key forward, Allender spent a season at South Melbourne before making the move with the club to Sydney. He joined Hawthorn in 1984 but couldn't establish a place in their strong side, suffering a fractured vertebra. He returned to Port Melbourne, and played there until the end of 1988.

Allender is the nephew of Port Melbourne and South Melbourne legend Peter Bedford.

References

Holmesby, Russell and Main, Jim (2007). The Encyclopedia of AFL Footballers. 7th ed. Melbourne: Bas Publishing.

External links

1960 births
Living people
Australian rules footballers from Melbourne
Sydney Swans players
Hawthorn Football Club players
Port Melbourne Football Club players
J. J. Liston Trophy winners
Lalor Football Club players